Jan Karpíšek (born 1981, in Jihlava) is a Czech contemporary painter, known for his cooperation with bees. He studied at the Faculty of Fine Arts of Brno University of Technology, at a studio led by Professor Martin Mainer (1999–2005). 
He then spent a half year in the art studio of performance of Professor Tomáš Ruller.

Karpíšek's work is characterized by topics such as effluxion, the erotic, and, above all, spirituality. He is deeply concerned with meditation and a number of his paintings are records of perception of the body system and soul; however, his paintings show no formal unity. His style sometimes evokes naivism or the grotesque, and at other times is similar to a gestic abstraction. He is also concerned with action painting, natural pigments and conceptual performance painting. The topic of his bachelor and master work was time. He won the Prize of Dean 2003 for his bachelor work; his large-format paintings are reminiscent of works by Gerhard Richter and Barnett Newman.

In 2004, Karpíšek won second place in the students' competition Artkontakt. His work "Mars" was bought in the same year by the National Gallery in Prague and presented in IBCA 2005 in Prague. Karpíšek participated on Václav Cílek's book Orfeus (The book of underground rivers) in 2009. In 2015 he was selected as a finalist of Dave Bown Projects, New York.

Karpíšek practices Zazen as taught by Master Dōgen and "Mike Eido Luetchford".
He is an active beekeeper and permaculture gardener. He has three sons.

Solo exhibitions 
“History lesson”, Labyrinth School, Brno, 1.9.-21.11.2021
“Spring of Collections”, Josef Jambor Gallery, Tišnov, 8.8.-27.9.2020
“Drawings and letters”, Zastavkafe, Chotěboř, 18.12.2019-30.1.2020
“Paintings by Bees”, Alternativa, Vysočina County Gallery, Jihlava, 13.9.-14.10.2018
“Paintings by Bees”, Diera do sveta, Liptovský Mikuláš, Slovakia, 21.7.-31.8.2018
“Paintings by father beekeeper”, Community center Brno-North, Brno, 16.3.-10.5.2018
“Drawings”, Doma Gallery, Kyjov, 13.5.-8.6.2017
"Art with Bees", Deptford Cinema, London, 16.-31.3.2017
"Layer of Illusion", Gallery U kolen / Tři ocásci, Brno, 10.10.-11.11.2016
"Plevel in Jindřišská", vegan & raw restaurant Plevel, Prague, 16.9.-10.11.2016
"Commemoration celebration for extinct plants", (with Ondřej Maleček), Na shledanou Gallery, Malsička cemetery, Volyně, 27.8.2016-1.9.2017
"Landscape is Divine", evangelical house of prayer, Brno Židenice, 11.6.-11.7.2016
"From The Red Hills", Café Park, Prague, 11.5.-8.6.2016
"5&30", Literary Tearoom Glass Meadow (Skleněná louka), Brno, 16.3.-7.5.2016
"Chaverim Tovim", (together with Daniela Mikulášková), Verbena, Brno, 20.1.-18.2.2016
"Rysunki dla Joachima", Café Šestá větev, Brno, 8.1.-6.2.2016
"Better And More Happily", (together with Tomáš Ronovský), industrial music bar and gallery Schrott, Brno, 27.11.2015-13.1.2016
"Reality is a miracle" (project VyTer, together with Ondrej Horak, curator Dominika Halvova), Gallery Off/Format, 11.3.-17.3.2015
"Mortgage on a coat", Gallery Dole, antiquarian bookshop Fiducia, Ostrava, 27.1.-7.3.2014
"About the teeth, about the objectives, about the mind, about the tranquility", Prokopka Gallery, Prague, 11.12.2012-14.1.2013
"The Green Man and other paintings", Café and Bakery Zastávka, Brno, 4.-30.9.2012
"I walked barefoot to the garden", Gallery under the city-hall, Club of art admirers Ústí nad Orlicí, 25.5.-15.6.2012
"Art with bees", Kabinet Gallery, Střítež, 11.9.-13.10.2011
"Reduced abstract and natural paintings", Lipka – The House of Ecological Education, Kamenná, Brno, 30.5.-30.6.2011
"down-to-earth", Místogalerie, Brno, 21.4.-12.5.2011
"Brian Tjepkema, Jan Karpíšek", (with Brian Tjepkema), Doma Gallery, Kyjov, 4.6.-20.6.2010
"Everything has got its own head!", (with Lukáš Karbus), Café Sausalito, Brno, 29.4.-9.6.2010
OHEŇÍHIT - Freegan art of time paintings?, U mloka Gallery, Olomouc, 21.10.-13.11.2009
"Well we all are in the Kettle, but everything is absolutely allright", Institute of macromolecular chemistry AV ČR, Prague, 13.10.-7.11.2008
"A Painter, A Man", Dolmen Gallery, Uherské Hradiště, 29.9.-26.10.2007
"Ecogardener’s brush-drawings on paper", Minikino Gallery, Ostrava, 28.9.-31.10.2007
"Confession in Krmítko (Bird Table)", student club Krmítko at Faculty of Arts (Masaryk University), Brno, 21.2.-14.3. 2006
"Following Mind and Time", Gallery Artkontakt, Brno, 2005
The Passing Of The Time (Performance), Festival New Media, Cheb, 2003
"Paintings", Salon Zena, Jezuitska Street, Brno, 2002/2003

External links 
 Video from the exhibition in OGV Jihlava
 Interview in Aesthetica Magazine
 Karpíšek's homepage

Czech painters
Czech male painters
People from Jihlava
1981 births
Living people